The Chairman of the Joint Chiefs of Staff (CJCS) Joint Distinguished Civilian Service Award (JDCSA). This award is the highest-ranking CJCS civilian service award under the approval authority of the Chairman of the Joint Chiefs of Staff.

Award procedure
This award is granted to any Federal Government civilian employee of the Joint Staff, combatant commands, joint organizations reporting to or through the Chairman, or any other Federal Government employee designated by the Chairman for service that far exceeds the contributions and service of others with comparable responsibilities and whose contributions are of a significantly broad scope.

Recipients may receive the award only once, and the award cannot be received in conjunction with a Secretary of Defense award for the same service.

Award device
Recipients of the award receive a medal set (medal, ribbon and lapel pin), a certificate signed by the Chairman and a citation.

References

Civil awards and decorations of the United States
Orders, decorations, and medals of the United States